Yardımcı (Turkish: Helper) is a surname of Turkish origin. People with the surname include:

 Barış Yardımcı (born 1992), Turkish football player
 Celal Yardımcı (1911–1986), Turkish politician 
 Erencan Yardımcı (born 2002), Turkish football player
 Nurettin Yardımcı (born 1944), Turkish archaeologist

Turkish-language surnames